Michael A. Fishbane (born 1943) is an American scholar of Judaism and rabbinic literature. Formerly at Brandeis University, he is currently Professor Emeritus of Jewish Studies at the Divinity School, University of Chicago.

Fishbane (Ph.D., Brandeis University) is well known as a Hebrew Bible scholar, especially for his work Biblical Interpretation in Ancient Israel and his work on the JPS Tanakh. He has also written on the subjects of Midrash, mysticism, myth and Jewish theology. In 2015, Fishbane published a multileveled comprehensive commentary presenting the full range of Jewish interpretations on the Song of Songs (Jewish Publication Society). 

He has received the Lifetime Achievement in Textual Studies award from the National Foundation For Jewish Culture.

Bibliography
 Biblical Interpretation in Ancient Israel, (Oxford Clarendon Press, 1985.)
 Garments of Torah: Essays in Biblical Hermeneutics,  (Indiana University Press, 1989.)
 The Kiss of God: Spiritual and Mystical Death in Judaism, (University of Washington Press, 1994.)
 The Exegetical Imagination: On Jewish Thought and Theology, (Harvard University Press, 1998.)
 Biblical Text and Texture: A Literary Reading of Selected Texts, (Oneworld Publications, 1998.)
 The JPS Bible Commentary: Haftarot, (Jewish Publication Society, 2002.)
 Biblical Myth and Rabbinic Mythmaking, (Oxford University Press, 2003.)
 Sacred Attunement: A Jewish Theology, (University of Chicago Press, 2007.)
 The JPS Bible Commentary: Song of Songs, (Jewish Publication Society, 2015)
 Fragile Finitude: A Jewish Hermeneutical Theology, (University of Chicago Press, 2021)

Awards 

 1986: National Jewish Book Award Scholarship for Biblical Interpretation in Ancient Israel
1994: National Jewish Book Award in the Jewish Thought category for The Kiss of God: Spiritual and Mystical Death in Judaism

References

Sources
Faculty page at the University of Chicago Divinity School

1943 births
Living people
Judaic scholars
Jewish biblical scholars
American biblical scholars
Brandeis University alumni
American Jewish theologians
Brandeis University faculty
University of Chicago faculty
20th-century Jewish biblical scholars
21st-century Jewish biblical scholars